The Royal Devon and Exeter NHS Foundation Trust ran Royal Devon and Exeter Hospital,  Honeylands Children's Centre (for specialist assessment and support for children with special needs and their families), the Exeter Mobility Centre (providing orthotics, prosthetics, wheelchairs and special seating), and the Mardon Neuro-Rehabilitation Centre. The trust's application for NHS Foundation Trust status was approved in December 2003, which became effective on 1 April 2004.

The trust took over the management of Castle Place Practice with 15,000 patients in Tiverton in 2018. It also now runs a number of community services including inpatient beds in  Tiverton, Sidmouth and Exmouth.

It merged with the Northern Devon Healthcare NHS Trust in April 2022 to form the Royal Devon University Healthcare NHS Foundation Trust, chaired by Dame Shan Morgan.

Performance

In October 2014, it was reported that the Trust was not meeting the government target for 85% of cancer patients to be treated within 62 days of being referred by their GP. The trust said it was due to increasing demand for complex surgery, and that treatment was only delayed if "clinically appropriate".

In May 2015, the trust reported an end-of-year deficit of £11.2million – an increase of £8.1M compared with the previous financial year.  
It expects a deficit of £20.2M for 2015/6.

Developments
In 2018, the trust announced that it was to implement a single Epic Systems electronic patient record systems in place of the 15 systems it has been using. It will cost £42M. The trust say "Patients will be able to access their patient records, medical history, and test results, and they will get instant confirmation of when appointments are booked rather than having to wait for letters to arrive."

In 2021 the trust bought the site of its local Nightingale Hospital, on an industrial estate outside the city, which will be used for several types of elective care.  It plans to lease two modular operating theatres on the site.

See also
List of NHS trusts
Healthcare in Devon

References

External links

Health in Devon
NHS foundation trusts